The mixed 50 metre rifle, prone was a shooting sports event held as part of the Shooting at the 1968 Summer Olympics programme. It was the eleventh appearance of the event. The competition was held on 19 October 1968 at the shooting ranges in Mexico City. 86 shooters from 46 nations competed.

Results

References

Shooting at the 1968 Summer Olympics
Men's 050m prone 1968